Lieutenant-General Sir Thomas Picton  (24 August 175818 June 1815) was a British Army officer who fought in the Napoleonic Wars. According to the historian Alessandro Barbero, Picton was "respected for his courage and feared for his irascible temperament". The Duke of Wellington called him "a rough foul-mouthed devil as ever lived", but found him capable.

Picton came to public attention initially for his cruelty during his governorship (1797–1803) of Trinidad, as a result of which he was put on trial in England for approving the illegal torture of a 14-year-old girl, Luisa Calderón. Though initially convicted, Picton later had the conviction overturned arguing that Trinidad was subject to Spanish law, which permitted the use of torture. Controversy over the torture and Picton's role in the colonial slave trade revived in recent years. In 2020, Cardiff Council voted to remove Picton's statue in the "Heroes of Wales" gallery in Cardiff City Hall. In the same year it was reported that a plaque was removed from Picton's birthplace.
In 2022, the National Museum Cardiff relocated Picton's portrait from its "Faces of Wales" gallery to a side room, accompanied by descriptions of his brutal treatment of the people of Trinidad.

Picton was for many years chiefly remembered for his exploits under Wellington in the Iberian Peninsular War of 1807–1814, during which he displayed great bravery and persistence. He was killed in 1815 fighting at the Battle of Waterloo, during a crucial bayonet charge in which his division stopped d'Erlon's corps' attack against the allied centre left. He was the most senior officer to die at Waterloo. He was a sitting Member of Parliament at the time of his death.

Early life
 
Thomas Picton was the seventh of 12 children of Thomas Picton (1723–1790) of Poyston Hall, Pembrokeshire, Wales, and his wife, Cecil née Powell (1728–1806). He was born in Haverfordwest, Pembrokeshire on (probably) 24 August 1758. In 1771 he obtained an ensign's commission in the 12th Regiment of Foot, but he did not join until two years later. The regiment was then stationed at Gibraltar, where he remained until he was made captain in the 75th Regiment of Foot (Prince of Wales's Regiment) in January 1778, at which point he then returned to Britain.

The regiment was disbanded five years later, and Picton quelled a mutiny amongst the men by his prompt personal action and courage, and was promised the rank of major as a reward. He did not receive it, and after living in retirement on his father's estate for nearly 12 years, he went out to the West Indies in 1794 on the strength of a slight acquaintance with Sir John Vaughan, the commander-in-chief, who made him his aide-de-camp and gave him a captaincy in the 17th Regiment of Foot. Shortly afterwards he was promoted major in the 58th Regiment of Foot.

Career in the New World
Under Sir Ralph Abercromby, who succeeded Vaughan in 1795, he was present at the capture of Saint Lucia (after which he was promoted to lieutenant colonel of the 56th Regiment of Foot) and then that of St Vincent.

After the reduction of Trinidad in 1797, Abercromby made Picton governor of the island. For the next five years he held the island with a garrison he considered inadequate against the threats of internal unrest and of reconquest by the Spanish. He ensured order by vigorous action, viewed variously as rough-and-ready justice or as arbitrary brutality. Picton was also accused of the execution of a dozen slaves. And the trade in captive humans was partly behind his considerable fortune. Historian Chris Evans said, "Delinquents who were sent for immediate execution might consider themselves lucky; others had to endure mutilation and torture."

In October 1801 he was gazetted to the local rank of brigadier-general. During the negotiations leading to the Peace of Amiens of 1802, many of the British inhabitants petitioned against the return of the island to Spain; this together with Picton's and Abercromby's representations, ensured the retention of Trinidad as a British possession.

By then, reports of arbitrariness and brutality associated with his governorship had led to a demand at home for his removal. Picton was also making money from speculation in land and slaves, and his free coloured mistress and mother of four of his children, Rosetta Smith, was believed to be corruptly influencing his decisions. Furthermore, Trinidad no longer faced any external threat, the Pitt ministry had fallen and the new Addington administration did not want Trinidad to develop the plantation economy Picton favoured. In 1802, William Fullarton (1754–1808) was appointed as the Senior Member of a commission to govern the island, Samuel Hood became the second member, and Picton himself the junior.

Fullarton had a very different background from Picton. He came from a wealthy and long-established Scots land-owning family and was a Whig MP, a Fellow of the Royal Society, an improving landlord, and a patron of Robert Burns. He had been a junior diplomat before raising a regiment in the course of the American War of Independence, of which he naturally became the Colonel. He ended that war in India, commanding an army of 14,000 men in operations against Tippu Sultan. Afterwards he had written an influential pamphlet arguing that the East India Company had brought trouble on itself by its unprincipled treatment of native princes and native subjects, and that a more humane policy would be preferable rather than "let them hate so long as they fear" (a favourite motto of Caligula).

Picton's policy with respect to various sections of the island population had effectively been "let them hate so long as they fear", and he and Fullarton rapidly fell out. (This, of itself, further worsened the rift: Fullarton's Indian pamphlet had also reported adversely on conflicts of interest and dissension between the English having weakened their ability to govern well, to negotiate effectively, and to effectively defend their possessions.) Fullarton commenced a series of open enquiries on allegations against Picton and reported his unfavourable views on Picton's past actions at length to meetings of the commission. Picton thereupon tendered his resignation on 31 May 1803.

Arrest and trials
Picton joined Hood in military operations in Saint Lucia and Tobago, before returning to Britain to face charges brought by Fullarton. In December 1803 he was arrested by order of the Privy Council and promptly released on bail set at £40,000.

The Privy Council dealt with the majority of the charges against Picton. Those charges related principally to accusations of excessive cruelty in the detection and punishment of practitioners of Obeah, severity to slaves, and of execution of suspects out of hand without due process. Only the latter class of charge seems to have seriously worried the Privy Council, and here Picton's argument that either the laws of Trinidad (then still the laws of the former Spanish colonial power: Abercromby had specifically instructed Picton to conduct himself according to those laws) or "the state of the garrison" (martial law) justified the immediate execution in the cases specified eventually carried the day.

 
Picton was, however, tried in the Court of King's Bench before Lord Ellenborough in 1806 on a single charge: the misdemeanour of having in 1801 caused torture to be unlawfully inflicted to extract a confession from Luisa Calderón, a young free mulatto girl suspected of assisting one of her lovers to burgle the house of the man with whom she was living, making off with about £500. Torture (but not the specific form) had been requested in writing by a local magistrate and approved in writing by Picton. The torture applied ("picketing") was a version of a British military punishment and consisted in principle of compelling the trussed-up suspect to stand on one toe on a flat-headed peg for one hour on many occasions within a span of a few days. Calderón was subjected to one session of 55 minutes, and a second of 25 minutes the following day. The young girl was suspended by one arm on a pulley rope set in the ceiling and lowered onto a peg in the floor, bare foot first. This continued until her entire body weight rested on the peg. She did not confess and was imprisoned for a further eight months before being released.

The period between Picton's return and the trial had seen a pamphlet war between the rival camps, and the widespread sale of engravings showing a curious British public what an attractive 14-year-old mulatto girl being trussed up and tortured in a state of semi-undress might look like. At the trial, Luisa Calderón gave evidence in person ("Her appearance was extremely interesting, and her countenance, which was that of a mulatto, extremely prepossessing and agreeable") of the nature and duration of her picketing. The legal arguments, however, revolved on whether Spanish law permitted torture of suspects. On the evidence presented by the prosecution and with Picton's defence being damaged by the cross-examination of his witnesses ("Mr Bourville was examined relative to the nature of the office of alkald, or justice at Trinidad. On his cross examination by William Garrow, he said, the first introduction of torture was by General Picton." ... "Mr Gloucester, the Attorney-General at Trinidad, verified several books as books of authority, in which it was expressly laid down, that by the Spanish law torture might be inflicted; these books were, the Borvillia, the Curia Phillipion, and the Elesando. On his cross-examination he admitted that the Caedula and Raecopilazione were also books of authority. They contained a code expressly applicable to the Spanish West India Islands, and there was not a word about torture in them"); the jury decided that it did not and found Picton guilty.

Picton promptly sought a retrial, which he got in 1808. At this, Picton's counsel stressed that the use of torture had been requested by the local magistrate, that there were copious authorities showing its legality under Spanish law, and that Calderón had been old enough to be legally tortured. Against the argument that torture was legal under the laws of Spain, but nowhere authorised by those of its colonies, he presented a considerable body of depositions from inhabitants of Trinidad showing that torture had frequently been resorted to by magistrates in the last years of Spanish occupation. The jury found that torture was authorised by the law of the island at the time of the cession, and that the defendant acted without malice, further than making an order which he thought himself bound to comply with. They therefore reversed the verdict of the earlier trial but asked for the full court to consider the further argument of the prosecution that torture of a free person was so repugnant to the laws of England that Picton must have known he could not permit it, whatever Spanish law authorised. The court ordered that Picton's obligations to the court be postponed until the court could consider the matter further but no judgment was ever delivered.

Friends of Picton in the military and among slave owners subscribed towards his legal expenses. Picton contributed the same sum to a relief fund after a widespread fire in Port of Spain. He had meanwhile been promoted major-general, and in 1809 he had been governor of Flushing in the Netherlands during the Walcheren expedition.

European military service

In 1810, at Wellington's request, Picton was appointed to command a division in Spain. Wellington recalled that he had been recommended by General Miranda, who considered him "extremely clever", but also did not trust him, because "he has so much vanity that if you sent him out to the Caraccas or the West India Islands, he would attempt to become the prince of them". Wellington commented when he met Picton,

For the remaining years of the Peninsular War, Picton was one of Wellington's principal subordinates. The commander-in-chief never reposed in him the confidence that he gave to Beresford, Hill and Robert Craufurd but in the resolute, thorough and punctual execution of a well-defined task Picton had no superior in the army. His debut, owing partly to his naturally stern and now embittered temper, and partly to the difficult position in which he was placed, was unfortunate. On the River Coa in July 1810 Craufurd's division became involved in an action, and Picton, his nearest neighbour, refused to support him, as Wellington's direct orders were to avoid an engagement. Shortly after this, however, at Busaco, Picton succeeded in driving French forces across a ravine in considerable disorder.

After the winter in the lines of Torres Vedras, he added to his reputation and to that of his division, the "Fighting" 3rd, at the Battle of Fuentes de Onoro. In September he was given the local rank of lieutenant-general, and in the same month the division won great glory by its rapid and orderly retirement under severe pressure from the French cavalry at the engagement at El Bodon. In October Picton was appointed to the colonelcy of the 77th Regiment of Foot.

In the first operations of 1812 Picton and Craufurd, side by side, stormed the two breaches of Ciudad Rodrigo. Both Craufurd and Picton's second in command, Major-General Henry MacKinnon, were mortally wounded in the engagement. At Badajoz, a month later, the successful storming of the fortress was due to his daring self-reliance and penetration in converting the secondary attack on the castle, delivered by the 3rd Division, into a real one. He was himself wounded in this terrible engagement, but would not leave the ramparts, and the day after, having recently inherited a fortune, he gave every survivor of his command a guinea. His wound, and an attack of fever, compelled him to return to Britain to recoup his health, but he reappeared at the front in April 1813. While in Britain he was invested with the collar and badge of a Knight of the Order of the Bath by the Prince Regent George, and in June he was made a lieutenant-general in the army. At this time, Picton purchased the Iscoed estate in Carmarthenshire, and was returned triumphantly as Member of Parliament for Pembroke Boroughs at a by-election on 19 March 1813.

At the Battle of Vitoria, Picton led his division across a key bridge under heavy fire.  According to Picton, the enemy responded by pummeling the 3rd with 40 to 50 cannon and a counter-attack on their right flank (which was still open because they had captured the bridge so quickly) causing the 3rd to lose 1,800 men (over one third of all Allied losses at the battle) as they held their ground. The conduct of the 3rd division under his leadership at Vittoria and in the engagements in the Pyrenees raised his reputation as a resolute and skilful fighting general to a still higher point. Early in 1814 he was offered, but after consulting Wellington declined, the command of the British forces operating on the side of Catalonia.

On the break-up of the division the officers presented Picton with a valuable service of plate, and on 24 June 1814 he received for the seventh time the thanks of the House of Commons for his great services. Somewhat to his disappointment he was not included amongst the generals who were raised to the peerage, but early in 1815 he was made a G.C.B.

Death

When Napoleon returned from Elba, Picton, at Wellington's request, accepted a high command in the Anglo-Dutch army, and was appointed commander of the 5th Infantry Division. Along with every other senior officer in the army, he was invited to the Duchess of Richmond's Ball that was held on 15 June.

On 18 June, at Waterloo, when Napoleon sent in the Comte d'Erlon's Corps to attack the Anglo-allied centre near La Haye Sainte at 13:30, Picton launched a bayonet charge on the advancing French column. While repulsing the attack with impetuous valour – his last words were "Charge! Charge! Hurrah! Hurrah!" – he was shot through the temple by a musket ball.

Announcing his death, Wellington wrote to the Minister of War, Lord Bathurst:

On subsequent examination, Picton's body was found to have suffered a serious musket ball wound to the hip at Quatre Bras on the 16th. Apart from his servant, he had told no one, nor had he consulted a surgeon, choosing instead to bandage the wound himself.

His body arrived in Deal in Kent on 25June to a salute from the guns of the ships moored in The Downs. It reached Canterbury the same evening and was deposited in a room at the Fountain Inn where Picton had dined on his way to the Continent. At 6:00 am on 26June, to the strains of the "Dead March" in Saul, the funeral procession accompanied by the 52nd Regiment of Foot with reversed arms moved off towards London where it arrived on 3July.

Burial and monuments
He was interred in the family vault at St George's, Hanover Square. A public monument was erected to his memory in St Paul's Cathedral, by order of Parliament, and in 1823 another Picton Monument was erected at Carmarthen by subscription, the king contributing a hundred guineas.  On 8 June 1859, his body was re-interred in St Paul's Cathedral, lying close to the body of the Duke of Wellington.

He is memorialised in St Michael's Church, Rudbaxton in Pembrokeshire, the parish in which he grew up. There is also a monument on the battlefield of Waterloo.

Namings in his honour
Places
 The town of Picton in Prince Edward County, Ontario, Canada 
 The town of Picton, New Zealand
 Picton, New South Wales, a town named by Picton's military colleague, Lachlan Macquarie
 Picton Junction, Western Australia was named by Waterloo veterans who settled the southwest of Western Australia
 Picton Island, at the east entrance of the Beagle Channel in South America; named by Robert Fitzroy and Phillip Parker King
Roads
 Picton Street, Griffithstown, Wales
 Picton Terrace, Blaenau Ffestiniog, Wales
 Picton Terrace, Carmarthen, Wales
 Picton Road, New South Wales, a highway in Australia
 Picton Street, Montpelier, Bristol. In 1783, while still a captain, Picton endeared himself to Bristolians by facing the rebellious 75th Battalion on College Green, Bristol and averting a military mutiny. There is also a double-bayed villa in the street named Picton Lodge.
 Picton Street, Port of Spain, Trinidad and Tobago.
Public houses
 The General Picton Inn in Porthcawl
 The General Picton in Picton Place, Nantyffyllon, Maesteg. The sign bears an image of Sir Thomas. The area also contains a Picton Street named after him; he owned a large amount of land in the area.
 The Picton is a public house in Commercial Road, Newport. The sign depicts Sir Thomas in military uniform resting the blade of his sword upon his left shoulder.
Other
 Picton Barracks, Bulford Camp, Wiltshire – the headquarters of the British Army's 3rd Division since 1992
 Picton Barracks, Carmarthen, Wales
 , a Royal Navy monitor launched in 1915
 The Rhymney Brewery in Rhymney, South Wales, produces a cask ale named General Picton
 The Picton, a boys' boarding house at Wellington College, Berkshire, a private school
 Picton House, a house at Haverfordwest Grammar School (closed 1978), Picton's old school in Haverfordwest, Pembrokeshire
 Sir Thomas Picton School (Ysgol Sir Thomas Picton), a mixed comprehensive school in Haverfordwest, Pembrokeshire, Wales – closed 2018.
 Picton Monument, Carmarthen, Wales
 Picton Arcade, Swansea. A covered city centre shopping area linking the Kingsway and Oxford Street.
 Picton House, Humphreys Estate, Gibraltar.

In fiction
In the 1970 Soviet-Italian epic film, Waterloo, Picton was played by the English actor Jack Hawkins.

Picton's trial is depicted in episode three of the third series of the 2011 television series Garrow's Law; Picton is played by Patrick Baladi.

Likenesses

 Oil portrait (c1812) of Sir Thomas Picton by Sir Martin Archer Shee, in the National Portrait Gallery.
 Oil portrait (c1815) by Sir William Beechey, at Apsley House, London.
 Bust (1816) by Sebastian Gahagan, in St Paul's Cathedral.
 Lithograph by an anonymous artist of Sir Thomas Picton on horseback (1815), in the National Portrait Gallery.
 Serravezza marble statue (1916) of Sir Thomas Picton by Thomas Mewburn Crook in Cardiff City Hall, one of a series entitled "Heroes of Wales".
In June 2020, in the wake of the George Floyd protests and the toppling of the statue of Edward Colston in Bristol, the Lord Mayor of Cardiff, Dan De'Ath, and the leader of Cardiff Council, Huw Thomas, supported calls to remove the City Hall statue on account of Picton's links to slavery. In July, the Council voted to remove the statue.
In November 2021 the Amgueddfa Cymru – National Museum Wales Cardiff removed his portrait which had been in the museum since 1907, due to his ties with slavery in Trinidad. In August 2022, the portrait, which had previously formed part of the "Faces of Wales" gallery, was put back on display in an exhibition called "Reframing Picton" and was surrounded by descriptions of his brutal treatment of the people of Trinidad.

References

Bibliography

External links

www.napoleonguide.com Picton
BBC: Picton past examined
narrative  – not transcript – of Picton's King's Bench trial

Political summary

 

|-

1758 births
1815 deaths
People from Haverfordwest
British Army generals
British military personnel killed in action in the Napoleonic Wars
British Army commanders of the Napoleonic Wars
British Army personnel of the Peninsular War
Gordon Highlanders officers
Suffolk Regiment officers
Royal Leicestershire Regiment officers
56th Regiment of Foot officers
Welsh army officers
Knights Grand Cross of the Order of the Bath
Governors of British Trinidad
Governors of British Tobago
Welsh military personnel
Members of the Parliament of the United Kingdom for Welsh constituencies
UK MPs 1812–1818